= Rural Health Initiative for Improved Living =

Nigerian non-profit organisation

- Abbreviation: RHIFIL
- Formation: 2015
- Founder: Rev. Josephine Kpere Daibo and Pastor (Dr.) Daibo
- Type: Non-governmental organization
- Headquarters: Benin City, Nigeria
- Website: Official website

Rural Health Initiative for Improved Living (RHIFIL) is a Nigerian non-governmental organisation with its headquarters located at Benin City, Edo State. The organisation is primarily focused on supporting rural communities by providing empowerment, advocacy initiatives, welfare schemes, and free healthcare programs for community members.

== History and background ==
RHIFIL was founded in 2015, and is led by Rev. Josephine Kpere Daibo, and Pastor (Dr.) Daibo, her husband. Its early projects began with medical outreaches, welfare and other empowerment programs for displaced families at the Home for the Needy camp, Benin City.

== Contributions ==
The Rural Health Initiative for Improved Living has established a solar-powered primary healthcare centre for displaced families at the Home for the Needy Camp in Benin City. They have also organized free healthcare services for residents in Edo State and Delta State, in addition to the renovation of six classrooms for internally displaced children in Edo State. In 2024, the NGO partnered with Ugbajo Itsekiri USA to conduct free medical outreaches in Itsekiri-speaking communities of Delta State, of which benefited over 1,500 people in Warri. In 2022, they collaborated with Medical Aid Trust International (MAT) in organizing a five days free medical outreach in Benin City. The NGO also collaborates with Babos Foundation (USA) to support education and welfare programs for internally displaced persons in Edo State.
